George Earle Chamberlain House may refer to:

George Earle Chamberlain House (Albany, Oregon)
George Earle Chamberlain House (Portland, Oregon)